Black Hand is a 1950 American film noir directed by Richard Thorpe and starring Gene Kelly as an Italian immigrant fighting against the Black Hand extortion racket in New York City in the first decade of the 20th century.

Plot
The film opens in 1900 as Roberto Colombo, an Italian-American attorney living in the Little Italy section of New York City, is killed by gangsters as he meets with a police officer to give information about an attempt to extort money from him. His widow and son return to Italy where his widow dies. In 1908, his son Giovanni Colombo (Gene Kelly) returns to New York City, determined to conduct a vendetta against the men who killed his father. He meets up with childhood friend Isabella Gomboli (Teresa Celli) and police detective Louis Lorelli (J. Carrol Naish), both of whom try to dissuade him.

After the man that Giovanni Colombo had hoped would tell him about his father's killers is murdered, Giovanni and Isabella work to rally people in Little Italy against the Black Hand racket, but that movement is dealt a set-back when Giovanni is attacked and his leg is broken. Recovering from his injury, Giovanni decides to study law as his father had, with the help of Isabella, with whom he has fallen in love. But when Lorelli shows them evidence uncovered after a bombing of a local store, Giovanni puts his studies on hold to help track down the perpetrators. The trial that results comes to nothing when a key witness is intimidated and refuses to testify, but the defendant is ultimately deported when police in Naples identify him as a fugitive from justice there.

Following the deportation, Lorelli travels to Italy to examine photographs of Italian criminals at large, in an attempt to identify other New York City gangsters that could be deported to Italy. He is attacked and killed in Italy, but only after he has mailed a list with the results of his research back to Giovanni in New York City. In an attempt to prevent this list from getting to authorities, gangsters kidnap Isabella's young brother. Giovanni is captured trying to save the boy, and reveals to the gangsters where they can find the list after they threaten to cripple the boy. After the gangsters get the list and the boy is released, Giovanni escapes and saves the list by igniting a bomb that he finds in the gangsters' hideout.

Cast

 Gene Kelly as Giovanni E. "Johnny" Columbo
 J. Carrol Naish as Louis Lorelli
 Teresa Celli as Isabella Gomboli
 Marc Lawrence as Caesar Xavier Serpi
 Frank Puglia as Carlo Sabballera
 Barry Kelley as Police Captain Thompson
 Mario Siletti as Benny Danetta / Nino
 Carl Milletaire as George Allani / Tomasino

 Peter Brocco as Roberto Columbo
 Eleonora von Mendelssohn as Maria Columbo
 Grazia Narciso as Mrs. Danetta
 Maurice Samuels as Moriani
 Burk Symon as Judge
 Bert Freed as Prosecutor
 Mimi Aguglia as Mrs. Sabballera

This was the only film role for Eleonora von Mendelssohn. Besides this one role, she is also known for her marriage to the German actor Martin Kosleck in 1947, which was unexpected at the time. In 1951, Eleonora von Mendelssohn took her own life.

Reception
According to MGM records the film earned $772,000 in the U.S. and Canada and $438,000 elsewhere; it recorded a loss of $55,000.

Critical response
Film critic Bosley Crowther praised Kelly's and Naish's work, while questioning the screenplay, "In his first 'straight' role in a picture—away from dancing and singing, that is—Mr. Kelly is eminently forceful as a young Italian-American who aspires to help his neighbors rid themselves of the bands of terrorists and extortionists which are fearfully known as 'the Black Hand.' And Mr. Naish is equally impressive as an Italian detective on the New York police force who joins in the youthful zealot's campaign to wipe out this terrifying scourge. One might tactfully question the simplicity of the plot, prepared by Luther Davis, as a wee bit theatrical."

Film critic Dennis Schwartz discussed the background of the film in his review: "Somewhat engaging early Mafia film that's based on a true story, when that infamous organization was known as the Black Hand. The Black Hand is 'based on the real-life story of Joseph Petrosino, a New York City police lieutenant who traveled to Palermo, Italy, to investigate the Mafia. He was shot and killed by snipers on the evening of March 12, 1909.' In the movie, Irish-American J. Carrol Naish plays the heroic Italian-American lieutenant's character. Director Richard Thorpe (Night Must Fall/Malaya/Ivanhoe) sets a dark mood, while Irish-American hoofer Gene Kelly plays a brave Italian-American immigrant out to avenge his father's death by the Mafia, at the turn of the 20th century. It's a rare dramatic role for Kelly, who seems to be at home in this genre."

References

External links
 
 
 
 

1950 films
1950 crime films
American crime films
American black-and-white films
1950s English-language films
Film noir
Films about immigration to the United States
Mafia films
Films about Italian-American organized crime
Films set in Naples
Films set in New York City
Films set in the 1900s
Metro-Goldwyn-Mayer films
1950s historical films
American historical films
Films directed by Richard Thorpe
1950s American films